Sagliains railway station is a connecting station on the Bever–Scuol-Tarasp railway in Sagliains, Switzerland. It is located at km 128.67 at 1432 m above sea level at the exit from the Sagliains valley between the villages and stations of Susch and Lavin in the Lower Engadine. It was built on material removed during the construction of the Vereina Tunnel. Sagliains station was opened to timetabled traffic with the Vereina tunnel on November 22, 1999.

The car loading station is equipped with two loading tracks next to a loading ramp, which stretches along the valley slope. It has a direct connection to the main road through a car tunnel and a covered gallery, which serves, among other things, the waiting road vehicles and has offices for cashiers. There is also a service building with a self-service kiosk. In addition to the transport of cars, Sagliains station also serves as an interchange station between the Scuol-Tarasp–Pontresina regional services and the Scuol-Tarasp–Landquart–Chur–Disentis regional express services.

As an interchange station, it only has an island platform without access from the outside. Thus, it is not normally possible to use this station for embarking and disembarking, except for changing trains.

Services
The following services stop at Sagliains:

 RegioExpress: hourly service between Disentis/Mustér and Scuol-Tarasp.

Gallery

Notes

References

External links
 
 

Railway stations in Graubünden
Rhaetian Railway stations
Zernez
Railway stations accessible only by rail
Railway stations in Switzerland opened in 1999